Violence (Swedish: Våld) is a 1955 Swedish drama film directed by Lars-Eric Kjellgren and starring Lars Ekborg, Doris Svedlund and Gunvor Pontén. It was shot at the Råsunda Studios in Stockholm. The film's sets were designed by the art director P.A. Lundgren.

Synopsis
The action takes place between 1938 and 1940. Klas Rylén, a volunteer in the Swedish Army, is facing a court martial for refusing to take up arms as a conscientious objector. He recalls the events of the past two years that have led him to this state at a time when much of Europe is being engulfed in the Second World War except for Neutral Sweden.

Cast
 Lars Ekborg as 	Klas Rylén
 Doris Svedlund as Vera Nilsson
 Gunvor Pontén as Helen Ivarson
 Sven-Eric Gamble as 	Norin 
 Helge Hagerman as 	Captain Fränne
 Carl-Olof Alm as 	Enok Mellberg
 Per Sjöstrand as 	Sjunnesson
 Lars Hofgård as 	Ljung
 Ragnar Klange as 	Ivarson
 Kåre Santesson as 	Broman
 Karl Erik Flens as 	Sgt. Råby
 Märta Dorff as 	Vera's mother
 Lars Egge as 	Judge
 Gösta Prüzelius as District attorney
 Josua Bengtson as 	Klas' grandfather 
 Gunlög Hagberg as 	Girl 
 Roland Hedlund as 	Officer 
 Hildur Lindberg a s	Waitress 
 Sten Mattsson as 	Soldier 
 Jan-Olof Rydqvist as 	Andersson 
 Håkan Serner as 	Officer 
 John Starck as 	Man at bridge

References

Bibliography 
 Krawc, Alfred. International Directory of Cinematographers, Set- and Costume Designers in Film: Denmark, Finland, Norway, Sweden (from the beginnings to 1984). Saur, 1986.

External links 
 

1955 films
Swedish drama films
1955 drama films
1950s Swedish-language films
Films directed by Lars-Eric Kjellgren
Films based on Swedish novels
Films set in the 1930s
Films set in the 1940s
Swedish black-and-white films
1950s Swedish films